Matthew Christopher Sinclair (born July 24, 1982) is a former American football linebacker. He was signed by the Baltimore Ravens as an undrafted free agent in 2005. He played college football at Illinois.

Sinclair has also played for the Miami Dolphins and Washington Redskins.

Head coach

On February 21, 2023, Sinclair accepted a head coaching position with the Fisher Jr. Sr. High School football team. This is his first time as a head coach.

External links
Illinois Fighting Illini bio
Washington Redskins bio
Chicago Tribune Weapons Charges
Fisher High School New Hire

1982 births
Living people
Players of American football from St. Louis
American football linebackers
Illinois Fighting Illini football players
Baltimore Ravens players
Miami Dolphins players
Frankfurt Galaxy players
Washington Redskins players